The Greek Summer Offensive of 1920 was an offensive by the Greek army, assisted by British forces, to capture the southern region of the Sea of Marmara and the Aegean Region from the Kuva-yi Milliye (National Forces) of the provisional Turkish national movement government in Ankara. Additionally, the Greek and British forces were supported by the Kuva-yi Inzibatiye (Forces of Order) of the Ottoman government in Constantinople, which sought to crush the Turkish nationalist forces. The offensive was part of the Greco-Turkish War and was one of several engagements where British troops assisted the advancing Greek army. British troops actively took part in invading coastal towns of the Sea of Marmara. With the approval of the Allies, the Greeks started their offensive on 22 June 1920 and crossed the 'Milne Line'. The 'Milne Line' was the demarcation line between Greece and Turkey, laid down in Paris. Resistance by the Turkish nationalists was limited, as they had few and ill-equipped troops in western Anatolia. They were also busy on the eastern and southern fronts. After offering some opposition, they retreated to Eskişehir on Mustafa Kemal Pasha's order.

Prelude
In May 1920, the Kuva-yi Inzibatiye, backed by the British, had been sent to seize the area of Geyve and İzmit, but they were repelled by the Turkish irregular forces. Subsequently, British aeroplanes bombed the Turkish positions in İzmit with little outcome. 3 regiments from the Kuva-yi Inzibatiye entrenched themselves at the outskirts of İzmit. Behind them were 2-3 British battalions and furthermore they were backed up by several British battleships from the sea. On 15 June, the Turkish nationalists tried to advance towards the Ottoman and British positions, but they made little progress, as British battleships and planes started to bomb them on 16–17 June. On this occasion, the British 15-inch naval guns saw their first action by bombing Turkish positions.

Offensive
Since they couldn't depend on the Kuva-yi Inzibatiye as the situation was a stalemate, the fighting around İzmit was key to the British deciding to bring in the Greek army for assistance and to punish the attacks on their troops.  The Greeks, meanwhile, were eager to conquer their historical homeland. The British military staff together with the Greek military staff planned the offensive for the southern coastal area of the Sea of Marmara and the Aegean Region. With these plans the Greek army started its offensive on 22 June 1920.

During the offensive, British and Greek troops jointly captured the following towns, some of these towns were invaded by naval landing forces: Akhisar (22 June); Kırkağaç, Soma and Salihli (24 June); Alaşehir (25 June); Kula (28 June); Balıkesir (30 June); Bandırma, Kirmasti and Karacabey (2 July); Nazilli (3 July); Gemlik and Mudanya (6 July); Bursa (8 July); Karamürsel (11 July); İznik (12 July); Gediz and Ulubey (28 August); Uşak (29 August); Simav (3 September). During the offensive against these areas, several clashes occurred between the advancing British-Greek troops and the defending Turkish irregular forces. For example, Mudanya had been tried to be captured as early as 25 June by naval landing forces, but stubborn Turkish resistance inflicted casualties on British forces and forced them to withdraw. On 6 July a British fleet of 12 ships bombed the town for three hours which killed 25 Turkish soldiers during the bombardment. After the bombardment British troops landed and took control of the town. There were many instances of successful delaying operations of small Turkish irregular forces against numerical superior enemy troops. Such as in Savaştepe when a Turkish irregular unit of 200 men delayed a Greek division of 10,000 men for one day.

Apart from these major settlements, several other smaller settlements were captured during the offensive.

Aftermath
The Turkish nationalists started a small counter-attack in the area of Gediz, but it had limited success.

Gallery

See also
Great Offensive
HMS Ramillies (07)
HMS Royal Sovereign (05)

References

External links
 British to fight rebels in Turkey, New York Times, 1 May 1920.
 British to defend Ismid-Black Sea line, New York Times, 19 July 1920
 Greeks enter Brussa; Turkish raids go on, New York Times, 11 July 1920
 Turk Nationalists capture Beicos, New York Times, 7 July 1920
 TURKISH REBELS MOVE TOWARD DARDANELLES, New York Times, 13 May 1920.
 British Warships Shell Kemal Pasha's Troops Nearing Intrenchments on Marmora Sea, New York Times, 7 June 1920.
 BRITISH INDIAN TROOPS ATTACKED BY TURKS; Thirty Wounded and British Officer Captured--Warships' Guns Drive Enemy Back, New York Times, 18 June 1920.

Sources
 Sinan Meydan: Cumhuriyet Tarihi yalanları: Yoksa siz de mi kandırıldınız?..., İnkılâp, 2010, pages 332–352. 

Battles of the Greco-Turkish War (1919–1922)
Battles involving the United Kingdom
1920 in the Ottoman Empire
1920 in Greece
Conflicts in 1920
Kuva-yi Milliye
Aegean Region
Marmara Region